The White Stadium (German: Das weiße Stadion) is a 1928 Swiss documentary film directed by Arnold Fanck about the 1928 Winter Olympics which were held in the Swiss resort of St. Moritz. The film received the backing of the International Olympic Committee and was the first of the Olympic feature films to be made. It was financed and distributed by the major German studio UFA, but was not a commercial or critical success.

Fanck's protégé Leni Riefenstahl later directed the much more successful Olympia portraying the 1936 Berlin Olympics.

References

External links
The White Stadium at Olympics.com

Films directed by Arnold Fanck
Swiss silent films
Swiss documentary films
Swiss black-and-white films
1928 documentary films
Documentary films about the Olympics
1928 Winter Olympics